The 1987 CECAFA Cup was the 14th edition of the tournament. It was held in Ethiopia, and was won by the hosts. The matches were played between December 13–27.

Group A

Group B

After competing one match, Malawi withdrew following the sudden death of the chairman of the FA of Malawi on December 13.

Semi-finals

Third place match

Final

References
Rsssf archives

CECAFA Cup
International association football competitions hosted by Ethiopia
CECAFA
1987 in Ethiopian sport